The stone triggerfish (Pseudobalistes naufragium) is the largest species of triggerfish.

Distribution 
It is found at reefs and over sandy bottoms in the eastern Pacific, ranging from Baja California (Mexico) to Chile.

Description 
It can reach  in length but is more common at about half that size. Covered entirely with platelike scales aside from one scaleless area behind the jaws. The stone triggerfish has 16 strong protruding teeth with 8 held in each jaw.

Diet 
Pseudobalistes naufragium feeds on small crustaceans, mollusks, and sea urchins.

References

External links
 

Balistidae
Taxa named by David Starr Jordan
Taxa named by Edwin Chapin Starks
Fish described in 1895
Fish of the Pacific Ocean